Jeff Decker is a sculptor and historian who is known for his bronze sculptures, the most notable of which is titled "By the Horns" (also known as The Hill Climber), a 16-foot-tall, 5,000-pound bronze located on the grounds of the Harley-Davidson Museum. His bronze-cast sculptures depicting the synergy of man and modern machines, particularly historic motorcycles, is known in both the motorcycling community and the world of fine art. , Decker was Harley-Davidson's official sculptor.

Professional background 
Decker is the son of Allen and Lana Decker. Steeped in the southern California car culture of the 1960s, Decker learned the ways of his father. An intense collector, Decker's father owned one of the area's largest flathead speed equipment collections.

Working full-time at a bronze casting foundry, Decker's first idea was to capture Man's quest for speed in all vehicles. His first sculpture was a 1924 Miller Indy car. Next came the Baby Bootlegger, a 1922 world record-holding speedboat.

On display at Bob Dron Harley-Davidson located in Oakland, California, Decker created a life-size bronze statue from a famous photograph of Joe Petrali showing him astride a Harley Streamliner, taken during Petrali's historic 136 mile per hour record setting run at Daytona on March 13, 1937. and is the only bronze sculpture artist licensed by Harley-Davidson to replicate their products. Decker also created a five-foot-tall, about 1,000-pound bronze of Elvis with a Harley-Davidson motorcycle he owned, a 1956 KHK model.

Bronze Sculptures

References 

Motorcycle builders
20th-century American sculptors
Living people
1966 births
People from Torrance, California
21st-century American sculptors